Jewel Hairston Bronaugh is an American government official who served as the 14th Deputy Secretary of Agriculture. She previously served as the 16th commissioner of the Virginia Department of Agriculture and Consumer Services from 2018 to 2021. Bronaugh is the first African-American to be Deputy Secretary of Agriculture.

Early life and education 
Bronaugh, a native of Petersburg, Virginia, earned a bachelor's degree in education at James Madison University. She completed a master's degree in education and doctorate in career and technical education from Virginia Tech.

Career 
In 2001, Bronaugh joined the faculty at Virginia State University (VSU). For five years, Bronaugh served as the dean of the VSU College of Agriculture before becoming executive director of the VSU Center for Agricultural Research, Engagement and Outreach (CAREO). In 2018, she was appointed by Virginia Governor Ralph Northam as the 16th Commissioner of the Virginia Department of Agriculture and Consumer Services. In January 2021, then-President-elect Joe Biden nominated her as the United States Deputy Secretary of Agriculture. She was confirmed by voice vote in the Senate on May 13, 2021 and sworn in on May 17, 2021.

On January 26, 2023, Secretary Vilsack announced that Bronaugh was to resign as deputy secretary.

References 

Living people
Year of birth missing (living people)
Place of birth missing (living people)
United States Deputy Secretaries of Agriculture
Biden administration personnel
Virginia State University faculty
Women deans (academic)
James Madison University alumni
Virginia Tech alumni
Women in Virginia politics
African-American people in Virginia politics
African-American women in politics
Politicians from Petersburg, Virginia
American women academics